Mohammad Reza Golzar (born  March 21, 1977) is an Iranian actor.

Early life
Mohammad Reza Golzar  was born on 21 March 1977 in Tehran in a family of Azerbaijani origin. His close friend Aria Sajadi helped him with his acting skills.

Career
Before starting his acting career with Sam and Narges, he gained fame as the guitarist of the Iranian music band, Arian Band. He is now a singer of the Rezzar Band led by Hamed Baradaran.

In 2000, he was invited to act in Sam and Narges by Iranian director, Iraj Ghaderi. He started to gain popularity after acting in more films such as Shaam-e Akhar, Zahr-e Asal, and  Boutique.

Golzar gained media attention when it was revealed that he was paid £55,000 for 3 days work while shooting Democracy in Bright Daylight in 2009, a relatively high fee for the country.

He is a graduate of Mechanical Engineering from Islamic Azad University. Golzar started his music career in 1998 as a guitarist with one of his close friends Arian Sajadi. He has played guitar, organ and percussion with Arian Sajadi.

Filmography
 Sam o Nargess (2000 – Iraj Ghaderi)
 Zamaneh (2001 – Hamidreza Salahmand)
 Bala-ye Shaher, Payeen-e Shahr (2002 – Akbar Khamin)
 Shaam-e Akhar (The Last Supper) (2002 – Fereydoun Jeyrani)
 Zahr-e Asal (2003 – Ebrahim Sheibani)
 Boutique (2003 – Hamid Nematollah)
 Cheshmane Siah (2003 – Iraj Ghaderi)
 Taleh (2006 – Siroos Alvand)
 Coma (2004 – Arash Moayerian)
 Gol-e Yakh (2005 – Kiomars Pourahmad)
 Sham-e Aroosi (2006 – Ebrahim Vahidzadeh)
 Atash Bas (Cease Fire) (2006 – Tahmineh Milani)
 Kalagh Par (2007 – Shahram Shah Hosseini)
 Tofighe Ejbari (2008 – Mohammad Hossein Latifi)
 Majnoone leyli (2008 – Ghasem Jafari)
 Democracy Tou Rouze Roshan (2009 – Ali Atshani)
 Two Sisters (2010 – Mohammad Banki)
 To Va Man (2011 – Mohammad Banki)
 Shish - o - Besh (Six and Five) (2011)
 Made in Iran 1 - (2011 – Mohammad Hossein Latifi)
 Atom Heart Mother (2013 – Ali Ahmadzadeh)
 I want to dance (2014 – Bahman Farmanara)
 Love is not Closed (2014– Bijan Birang)
 Salaam Mumbai (2016 – Ghorban Mohammadpour)
 Ayeneh Baghal (2017 – Manochehr Hadi)
 Rahman 1400 (2017 – Manochehr Hadi)
 We Are All Together (2018 Kamal Tabrizi) 
 Gisoo ( Asheghane2 ) (2020 Manochehr Hadi)

References

External links

 
 
 
 Mohammad Reza Golzar on Spotify

1977 births
Living people
Iranian guitarists
People from Tehran
Iranian male models
Iranian pop singers
Iranian Azerbaijanis
Iranian pop musicians
21st-century guitarists
Iranian male film actors
Islamic Azad University alumni
21st-century Iranian male actors